Boris Becker and Michael Stich were the defending champions, but Becker did not compete this year. Stich teamed up with Udo Riglewski and lost in quarterfinals to Sergio Casal and Emilio Sánchez.

Stefan Edberg and Petr Korda won the title by defeating Paul Haarhuis and Mark Koevermans 3–6, 6–2, 7–6 in the final.

Seeds
The top four seeds received a bye to the second round.

Draw

Finals

Top half

Bottom half

References

External links
 Official results archive (ATP)
 Official results archive (ITF)

Doubles